Hunky Dory is a 1971 David Bowie album.

Hunky dory may also refer to:
Hunky dory, a slang term meaning "satisfactory" or "good" 

Hunky Dory (film), a 2011 British independent musical film
Hunky Dory Trail, in the Rocky Mountains
Hunky Dorys Park, another name for United Park in Drogheda